is a former Japanese football player.

Playing career
Ito was born in Mie Prefecture on June 29, 1976. After graduating from high school, he joined Japan Football League club Cosmo Oil (later Cosmo Oil Yokkaichi) based in his local in 1995. However the club was disbanded end of 1996 season. In 1997, he moved to J1 League club Nagoya Grampus Eight. Although he played several matches in 1997, he could not play at all in the match from 1998. In 2000, he moved to Japan Football League club Jatco TT. He retired end of 2000 season.

Club statistics

References

External links

1976 births
Living people
Association football people from Mie Prefecture
Japanese footballers
J1 League players
Japan Football League (1992–1998) players
Japan Football League players
Cosmo Oil Yokkaichi FC players
Nagoya Grampus players
Jatco SC players
Association football forwards